Samson and His Mighty Challenge is a 1964 Italian sword-and-sandal film, released in 1965 at the very tail end of the peplum craze.  Its original title was Ercole, Sansone, Maciste e Ursus gli invincibili (Hercules, Samson, Maciste, and Ursus: the Invincibles). It is also known as Samson and the Mighty Challenge, Combate dei Gigantes (Battle of the Giants), Triumph of the Giants or Le Grand Defi (The Great Battle).

Synopsis
Hercules argues with his father Zeus who thinks that his son should follow the road of virtue. Instead, Hercules follows the road of pleasure which leads him to the city of Lydia. There he falls in love with the princess Omphale and he asks from her mother Nemea permission to marry her. Although Nemea is thrilled with the idea of having a demigod as a husband for her daughter, Omphale doesn't even want to hear about it because she is in love with Inor the barbarian prince. So the couple crafts a cunning plan.

They hide their dwarf friend under the statue of Zeus and he tells Hercules that in order to marry Omphale he must battle with the most powerful man in the world: Samson. Hercules agrees and the queen sends a messenger to tell Samson about the fight. Samson agrees, although his wife Delilah thinks that it is not a good idea because her husband has a taste for beautiful women. So Delilah cuts his hair and makes him weak. However, the messenger does not know this, and he thinks that his wife doesn't let him go. In order to return to Lydia with Samson, he hires the troublemaker Ursus who recently lost a fight to Maciste to kidnap him.

Cast 
 Alan Steel as Hercules
 Howard Ross as Maciste
 Nadir Moretti (credited as Nadir Baltimore) as Samson
 Yann L'Arvor as Ursus 
 Luciano Marin as Inor
 Hélène Chanel as Onphale
 Elisa Montés as Onfale
 Lia Zoppelli as Nemea 
 Moira Orfei as Delilah
 Maria Luisa Ponte as Ursus' mother
 Conrado San Martín as Marinero 
 Livio Lorenzon
 Carlo Tamberlani

Reinterpretation
In 1993 this film was re-released as a comedy under the name Hercules Returns.  The original dialogue was overdubbed by Australian actors and a number of extra scenes were filmed.

Bibliography

References

External links

Samson and His Mighty Challenge at Variety Distribution
 (1993 remake)

1964 films
1960s fantasy adventure films
Peplum films
Italian fantasy adventure films
1960s Italian-language films
Films directed by Giorgio Capitani
Films scored by Piero Umiliani
Italian crossover films
Maciste films
Sword and sandal films
1960s Italian films